Caroline Louisa Cavendish-Bentinck (née Burnaby; baptised 5 December 18326 July 1918) was the maternal grandmother of Queen Elizabeth The Queen Mother, great-grandmother of Queen Elizabeth II, and great-great-grandmother of King Charles III.

Early life
Caroline Louisa Burnaby was born at Baggrave Hall, near Hungarton, Leicestershire on 23 November 1832. She was a daughter of Edwyn Burnaby of Baggrave Hall and his wife, the former Anne Caroline Salisbury. She was baptised on 5 December 1832 at Hungarton, Leicestershire. She was a sister of Edwyn Burnaby, a first cousin of Frederick Gustavus Burnaby, and an aunt of Algernon Burnaby.

Marriages and issue
Louisa Burnaby married the Rev. Charles Cavendish-Bentinck, as his second wife, on 13 December 1859.  Rev. Cavendish-Bentinck was the elder son of Lieutenant Colonel Lord Charles Bentinck and Anne Wellesley, formerly Lady Abdy. His paternal grandparents were William Cavendish-Bentinck, 3rd Duke of Portland, Prime Minister of Great Britain, and Dorothy Cavendish, a daughter of William Cavendish, 4th Duke of Devonshire.  Together Louisa and Charles were the parents of three children:

 Cecilia Nina Cavendish-Bentinck (1862–1938), who married Claude Bowes-Lyon, 14th Earl of Strathmore and Kinghorne.
 Ann Violet Cavendish-Bentinck (1864–1932).
 Hyacinth Cavendish-Bentinck (1864–1916); who married an American, Augustus Edward Jessup, a son of Alfred Dupont Jessup. Augustus was the widower of Lady Mildred Marion Bowes-Lyon.

After her first husband's death in 1865, she married Henry Warren Scott, the son of Sir William Scott, 6th Baronet, of Ancrum, on 30 September 1870. He died on 23 August 1889 at Forbes House, Ham, Surrey, and was buried in St Andrew's Church, Ham.

Louisa Scott, died aged 85, twice widowed, on 6 July 1918 at Dawlish, Devon.

Descendants 
Through her eldest daughter Cecilia, the Countess of Strathmore and Kinghorne, she was a grandmother of Queen Elizabeth the Queen Mother and thus the great-grandmother of Queen Elizabeth II.

Ancestors

References

Louisa
People from Leicester
1832 births
Year of birth uncertain
1918 deaths